Oggy and the Cockroaches is a French comedy-adventure animated television series produced by Gaumont Multimedia (first two seasons) and Xilam Animation (third season onwards), and created by Jean-Yves Raimbaud, co-creator of Space Goofs, who died during production of Oggy's first season. It loosely resembles the American animated franchise Tom and Jerry by William Hanna and Joseph Barbera. The show employs silent comedy: characters either do not speak or use unintelligible vocalizations and gestures. The show premiered in September 1998 on France 3, and later expanded internationally.

In September 2020, a reboot series was announced, entitled Oggy and the Cockroaches: Next Generation, in which Oggy takes care of Piya, a seven-year-old female elephant from India. It was released worldwide in Netflix on July 28, 2022, with 13 episodes compiling 6 segments. Although it differs noticeably from the original in terms of its visuals and tone, Gulli labels it as Oggys eighth season.

Synopsis
Oggy, an anthropomorphic cat, would prefer to spend his days watching television and eating but is continually pestered by three roaches: Joey, Marky and Dee Dee. The cockroaches' slapstick mischief ranges from plundering Oggy's refrigerator to hijacking the train he just boarded. In many situations, Oggy is also helped by Jack, who is more violent and short-tempered than him and is also annoyed by the cockroaches. Bob, a short-tempered bulldog, also appears in the show and is Oggy's neighbor.

Episodes

Characters
Some of the characters make a cameo in Xilam's other shows, such as Zig & Sharko and The Daltons and in the film, Go West! A Lucky Luke Adventure. The eponymous characters make a debut in the Space Goofs episode "Venus Junior", where they are seen on the aliens' television. In the second season, "Space Sailors" has a gag where the cockroaches ride on by Etno, in the aliens' flooded house. Oggy, the cockroaches and Jack appear as drawings in "Doodle", albeit with a differently colored Jack, and make another cameo in the episode "The Alien Show".

Main
 Oggy is a cat with a light blue body, green eyes, red nose, grey tummy and white feet. Oggy usually spends his time either watching TV or doing housework, when he's not chasing the cockroaches. Despite the constant mayhem caused by the cockroaches, Oggy has developed a sort of love–hate relationship with them, having lived with them for a long time. Whenever he finds himself alone in his house, he will eventually begin to miss the cockroaches along with their pranks (as seen in the episode "Priceless Roaches" and "So Lonely"/"Alone at last") followed by nothing interesting happening in his life. According to executive producer Marc du Pontavice and France Info, Oggy was named after punk rock musician Iggy Pop and the rock album The Rise and Fall of Ziggy Stardust and the Spiders from Mars. In early episodes, Oggy, like his Tom and Jerry counterpart was the main punching bag in the series.  He also has a fear of heights, as shown in "The Rise & the Fall"/"Vertigo" – however, it only applied for Jack's construction site.
 The Cockroaches are a gang of three cockroaches named Dee Dee, Marky and Joey (It is also implied that the roaches are named after members of the rock band The Ramones), who love playing tricks on other characters such as Oggy and Jack. However, if the cats left, they would miss each other as seen in "Moving Out". The cockroaches have wide heads, vibrantly-colored sclerae with long, pointed black noses and black feet. They also have black "caps" with their antennae, like Oggy.
 Dee Dee is the youngest cockroach with a dark blue body, orange head and green eyes. Always hungry, his appetite sometimes reaches insane proportions, often resulting in the consumption of larger animals or other things that would otherwise be inedible (such as hyenas in one case and, due to the effects of a poisonous mushroom in another case, an insect; other instances include the fish on the wallpaper in "Oggy's Clone"/"Oggy's Costume" and a clownfish in "Scuba Diving"). He is known to like opera, with "Night at the Opera" focusing on this aspect. Sometimes it is shown that his feet are so foul-smelling that the juice they produce is toxic and can melt objects, as seen in "Caught in a Trap"/"High Security Fridge". He is named after bassist Dee Dee Ramone.
 Marky is the tallest cockroach with a silver body, green head and pink eyes (originally red). Although Marky originally used to love causing mischief just like Dee Dee and Joey, he has grown to be more laid-back as the series progressed. In most episodes, he is shown with Dee Dee as his partner-in-crime. His hobbies are dating puppets and reading books (though never shown); he also has bad breath as revealed in "It's a Small World"/"Itsy-Bitsy Oggy". While his eyes changed to a less intense color, they turn red again at one point, in "Teleportation". He is named after drummer Marky Ramone.
 Joey is a cockroach with a purple-pink body, pink right eye (originally red), a yellow left eye, and a lavender head. Even though he is the shortest roach in the group, he is the most intelligent, always being the brain in the plans, but is sometimes forced to go alone because Marky and Dee Dee often think that his plans are stupid. He loves money, but his efforts always fall short, usually ending with him getting swatted or beaten up. He is named after lead singer Joey Ramone.

Recurring
 Jack is a cat with an olive green body, yellow eyes, red nose, pale pink stomach, and white feet. In contrast to Oggy, he is more short-tempered, violent, and arrogant than him. He often finds himself building huge machinery, such as roach-catching contraptions, and is very interested in physics and chemistry (that is, the more explosive parts of it). Jack has an excellent relationship with Oggy, as he cares about him a lot, especially in the episode "Happy Birthday" where he tries to stop Oggy from committing suicide. Jack mostly lives and sleeps at Oggy's house, and owns a green jeep in which he and Oggy go for a variety of journeys, to the beach, and to go fishing. He is sometimes seen trying to propose to Monica, but the cockroaches' pranks always make it stop. In one episode ("Don't Rock the Cradle"/"Oggy the Babysitter"), Jack and Monica seem to have a baby together and ask Oggy to babysit their child. In "Just Married", Jack plans to get married but it got canceled at the end due to the cockroaches sneaking in and causing trouble. In the Hindi dub(s), Jack is depicted as the older brother of Oggy.
 Bob is a fierce brown bulldog and Oggy's neighbor who has severe anger issues with him, especially when Oggy, Jack or the roaches do something that accidentally crushes Bob, shaves his fur or destroys his house, with him proceeding to pummel Oggy or Jack off-screen. Despite this, he has some sort of friendship with them, as notably seen in some episodes like "Olivia", "Steamed Out", "Oggy Splits Hairs", "Back To The Past" etc. In addition, Bob also works as a police officer in several episodes. In one episode ("Back To School"), he was presented as a teacher of Oggy and Jack.
 Oggy's grandma is the least known member of Oggy's family who appears in several episodes, including "Granny's Day" and "Oggy's Grandma" (where she appears to be very strict with Oggy's mannerisms). She also makes a cameo in "Deep Trouble" where she supports Oggy and Jack with Monica. In "Granny's Day", she attacks the cockroaches but is actually attacked by them in "Oggy's Grandma", one time getting her head flattened by the lid of Oggy's toilet. She also gets frequent, short-lasting bursts of energy from coffee, which aids her in defeating the cockroaches. In "Granny's Day", she captures Joey and Marky, but feels sympathy for them, when Dee Dee cries on a picture of the trio with the other two crossed out.
 Monica is Oggy's twin sister and Jack's love interest, the latter of whom she has a child within "Oggy the Babysitter"/"Don't Rock the Cradle"). Known for being active and likes to take on physical challenges such as sky diving and bungee jumping, she is sometimes seen rollerskating. Of all the characters, Monica has the least appearances, although she makes a brief one in "Oggy Is Getting Married", where she sits next to Bob. She later plays a major role as Olivia's rival in the episode, "Sharing Oggy" (although they later become friends).
 Olivia is a white cat with a yellow bow on her head who debuts in season 4, and becomes Oggy's girlfriend. Olivia is aware of the cockroaches' mischief, so she stops them when they are around by using some aggressive methods. In "Oggy and the Not-so-Smart Bracelet", Olivia actually retaliates toward the cockroaches, strangely enough. Olivia cares a lot about her appearance as seen in the episode "Olivia's Pimple", where she refuses to leave her house when she saw a pimple on her face. In "Oggy Is Getting Married", as the episode title implies, Olivia and Oggy get married after a trip to Venice, Italy and she currently becomes Oggy's wife. However, their life after said marriage is not shown later in the series.
 Lady K is a light yellow female cockroach who debuted in the episode of the same name (in season 4), as the cockroaches' new love interest (mainly Joey's). She lives in Olivia's house which Olivia is not aware of, and hates her for unknown reasons. She frequently attempts to use the cockroaches as her pawns to get what she wants or her job done.
 Pit is a gray dog living in the same neighborhood as Oggy who debuted in season 4. Like Bob, he is also strong.
 Bobette is Bob's daughter who debuted in season 5. She is Jack's love interest, as seen in the episodes "Marky's Tournament" (where Marky also had a crush on her) and "Jackromeo and Bobette". She is seen in the episode "Emperor for a Day" as Napoleon's love interest. 
 The Policeman is an unnamed human policeman who is normally seen in traffic or sometimes in Oggy's area. Sometimes Oggy or Jack accidentally annoy him due to the cockroaches. He appears in all seasons except for the fifth.
 The Doctor is an unnamed human doctor who sometimes visits Oggy's house when Oggy gets sick. In the episodes "A Dog Day's Afternoon"/"Cute Little Puppy", it is shown that he has a pet puppy. He is also shown in "Missing In Action"/"Where is the Exit?" as an artist (specifically, a painter), but no longer does appear in season 5.

Production
After a four-year gap in production, season 5 was released in late 2017 with two more seasons coming later. Season 6 episodes began airing on K2 while Season 5 was previewed on Gulli.

Broadcast
Oggy and the Cockroaches originated from France, and the series originally aired on France 3 (seasons 1 and 2 with reruns of seasons 3 and 4), Canal+ Family (seasons 3 and 4), Gulli (seasons 5-present, who also reran older episodes from November 2005 to May 2009 on the GRRR!!!, GulliGulli, GulliGang and GulliGood blocks), with reruns airing on other French networks like Canal J, Canal+, Télétoon+, France 4, and Tiji.

In the Philippines, the series aired on TV5 in 2010. In late 2011, it was welcomed on Cartoon Network line-up and adored by the channel, and still airs due to the said show being one of the network's top-viewed programs. It also aired on Disney Channel from 2009 to December 31, 2013. It moved on GMA Network on September 3, 2022, under the network's Astig Authority Saturday morning block.

In Arab countries, it aired on Ajyal TV, MBC3, and Basma Channel. It also airs on 2M in Morocco and local Tunisian channels. (i.e. Tunis 7)

In Italy, it was broadcast on Italia 1, Hiro, Boing, K2, and Frisbee.

It also aired in India from 2009 to 2012 on Nickelodeon. In 2012, the series was taken by Cartoon Network which broadcast the show until its fourth season. In 2015, Nickelodeon started rebroadcasting the show's older episodes, from seasons 1 to 3. Later, the series was also picked up by Sonic Nickelodeon which broadcast the same seasons as Nick. Season 5 started airing on Cartoon Network from 14 August 2017. Seasons 3 and 6, 7 aired later, during 2018–19 in Cartoon Network India. In 2020, Sonic Nickelodeon started airing season 4 again. Cartoon Network aired seasons 5 to 7 until March 2022. From 2021, Sony YAY! took over the rights of all seven seasons.

Due to licensing issues in India, the Indian studio Toonz Animation made a Flash-animated adaptation, titled Pakdam Pakdai.

Media

Home media
Five DVDs came out in 2003 in the United States, with 12 episodes each. In 2005, several VHSs were released in New York City.

On 8 October 2008, a French DVD box-set of the complete first season, plus the pilot and the episode "Working Cat", was released. On 6 September 2010, three French DVD box sets of the complete first, second, and third seasons were made available. In July 2011, a French DVD box-set containing all episodes from seasons 1, 2 and 3 became available. Seasons 4 to 7 are yet to be available. Multiple VHSs were sold in Italy.

Magazine
A magazine called  came out in France in 2009 (two issues), then again in 2011.

 n°1: 11 July 2009
 n°2: 21 October 2009
 n°3: 14 January 2011

Music
A music album titled  was released in France on CD and for digital download on 6 September 2010.

Comics
A French comic series was adapted from the series, which first started out in 2010.

 16 April 2010:  vrooo !
 5 November 2010: 
 23 September 2011: 

An American comic was planned to be released in the summer of 2019. The first issue was released on 11 December 2019, after being delayed two times. It is published by American Mythology Productions. The comic was released on a bi-monthly schedule, but was on a hiatus for four months after two issues were published due to the COVID-19 pandemic's effect on the comic book industry. Issue #3 was published on 24 June 2020. It is currently on hiatus as of 23 October 2020.

CD drama
A CD drama, was released in France on CD and for digital download in October 2012. It contains narrations of five episodes by Anthony Kavanagh.

Film

The film Oggy and the Cockroaches: The Movie (originally ) was released to theatres on 7 August 2013.

Video game
A video game for the Game Boy Advance based on the television show was planned and developed by Xilam, but was cancelled.

Spin-off

Oggy Oggy which centers on a kitten version of Oggy released on August 24, 2021.  It is CG-animated. The series was released on Netflix and is the first French Netflix Original series.

Reboot

It focuses on the wacky antics of Oggy and the trio of mischievous cockroaches that inhabit his house.

Controversy
On 14 March 2015, TMZ reported that a young viewer had pointed out a brief image of a poster in the background with a woman's exposed breasts, shown in the episode "(Un)happy Camper!", which was broadcast on Nickelodeon in the United States on the same day, with some parents complaining about the incident to the network. However, the series aired in a timeslot (3:30 p.m. ET/PT) on the American Nickelodeon network, before most school-age children got home from school, so the incident did not gain mainstream media attention. The series continued to air on Nickelodeon in that timeslot until the season's episodes were exhausted, and it aired on sister network Nicktoons until 1 May, likely solely for contractual purposes due to Nickelodeon's worldwide deal for the series which requires an airing on its American networks. For future airings of the episode worldwide, and on the official Oggy channel on YouTube, the poster image is replaced with a neutral beach scene.

Reception 
As of February 2023, the show holds a 7.5/10 rating on IMDb and a 2/5 stars rating on Common Sense Media. The show is considered a cult classic by many people in Europe, Asia and North America, where their biggest fanbase comes from: especially India, Pakistan, France (it's home country), Germany, Vietnam, Singapore, Thailand, Malaysia, Indonesia and the United States of America.

See also 
 Oggy and the Cockroaches: The Movie
 List of French animated television series
 List of French television series

References

External links

Website of the producer Xilam 

1990s French animated television series
1998 French television series debuts
2019 French television series endings
2000s French animated television series
2010s French animated television series
Animated television series without speech
Canal+ original programming
Censored television series
French-language television shows
Fictional rivalries
French children's animated comedy television series
French children's animated adventure television series
Television shows adapted into films
Animated television series about cats
Animated television series about insects
Television series revived after cancellation
Xilam